Ballad of a Soldier (Ballada o soldate), is a 1959 Soviet film directed by Grigory Chukhray and starring Vladimir Ivashov and Zhanna Prokhorenko. While set during World War II, Ballad of a Soldier is not primarily a war film. It recounts, within the context of the turmoil of war, various kinds of love: the romantic love of a young couple, the committed love of a married couple, and a mother's love of her child, as a Red Army soldier tries to make it home during a leave, meeting several civilians on his way and falling in love. The film was produced at Mosfilm and won several awards, including the BAFTA Award for Best Film From Any Source and was nominated for an Academy Award for Best Original Screenplay.

Plot
A middle-aged farm woman walks through her village and gazes down a country road. A voiceover reveals that her son was killed in the war and buried in a foreign land.

On the Eastern Front, nineteen-year-old Private Alyosha Skvortsov (Vladimir Ivashov) single-handedly destroys two attacking German tanks, more out of self-preservation than bravery. His commanding general wants to give him a decoration, but Alyosha asks instead for a leave to see his mother and to repair the leaking roof of their home. He is given six days.

During his journey, he sees the devastation the war has wrought on the country and meets various people. When the jeep Alyosha is riding gets stuck in the mud, Private Pavlov helps push it out. As Alyosha will be passing through his home city, Pavlov persuades him to take a present to Pavlov's wife. Pavlov's sergeant reluctantly parts with two bars of soap, the entire supply for their platoon.

At the train station, Alyosha helpfully carries the suitcase of Vasya, a soldier discharged because he has lost a leg. Vasya does not want to go home, as he would be a burden to his wife, and their relationship had already been troubled. However, he changes his mind and is welcomed with open arms by the loving woman.

When he attempts to board a freight car of an army supply train, Alyosha is stopped by Gavrilkin, a sentry. However, a bribe of a can of beef eases Gavrilkin's fear of his lieutenant, a "beast". Shura (Zhanna Prokhorenko) later sneaks aboard as well, but when she sees him, she becomes frightened and tries to jump off the speeding train. Alyosha stops her from risking her life. She tells him she is going to see her fiancé, a pilot who is recuperating in a hospital. As the days pass, she loses her fear and mistrust of him. Gavrilkin spots the civilian stowaway, forcing Alyosha to bribe him anew. When the lieutenant discovers the unauthorized passengers, he lets them remain aboard and even makes Gavrilkin return the bribe.

At one stop, Alyosha gets out to fetch some water, but the train leaves without him. Frantic, he gets a lift to the next station from an old woman truck driver. He is too late; the train has already departed. However, Shura got off and is waiting for him. The couple then go to see Pavlov's wife. They discover that she is living with another man and leave. Alyosha returns, takes back the soap he had given her, and gives it instead to Pavlov's invalid father.

When they finally part, Shura confesses she lied; there was no fiancé, only an aunt. Alyosha realizes too late, after his train departs, that when Shura said she had no one, she was telling him that she loves him. His train is stopped by a blown-up bridge and set on fire by German bombers. With time running out, Alyosha rafts across the river and persuades another truck driver to give him a ride to his rural village, Sosnovka. He gets to see his mother only for a few minutes before having to make his way back to his unit. His mother vows to wait for him. The voiceover tells us that while he could have gone far in life if he had lived, he will always be remembered simply as a Russian soldier.

Cast
 Vladimir Ivashov as Private Alyosha Skvortsov
 Zhanna Prokhorenko as Shura
 Antonina Maksimova as Alyosha's mother
 Nikolai Kryuchkov as the general
 Yevgeni Urbansky as Vasya
 Elza Lezhdey as Vasya's wife
 Aleksandr Kuznetsov as Gavrilkin
 Yevgeni Teterin as The lieutenant
 Valentina Markova as Liza (Pavlov's wife)
 Marina Kremnyova as Zoya (neighbor girl)
 Vladimir Pokrovsky as Pavlov's invalid father
 Georgi Yumatov as Sergeant giving bars of soap
 Gennadi Yukhtin as Private Seryozha Pavlov
 Valentina Telegina as Old woman truck driver
 Lev Borisov as Joking soldier on train
Yevgeny Yevstigneyev as Truck driver

The two lead actors, Ivashov and Prokhorenko, were both only nineteen years old and did not have much acting experience. Grigory Chukhray commented on his casting choice:

We took a big risk. It was risky to give the main roles to quite inexperienced actors. Not many would have done so in those times, but we ventured and did not regret afterwards. Volodya and Zhanna gave the most precious colouring to the film, that is, the spontaneity and charm of youth.

Both would go on to long careers in cinema.

Production
According to Robert Osborne, the primary host of Turner Classic Movies, Soviet leader Nikita Khrushchev was a fan of the director, so Chukray was given more leeway than normal.

Reception
Ballad of a Soldier was released on December 1, 1959 in the Soviet Union and sold 30.1 million tickets at screenings.

The film was released in the United States in 1960 as part of a Soviet-American film exchange during a thaw in the Cold War. Other films shown in the US as part of this cultural exchange included The Cranes Are Flying (1957) and Fate of a Man (1959).
 
The film received considerable praise for both its technical craft and its strong, yet subtle story. Viewed from the earnestness and unabashed youthfulness of the protagonist, the film was hailed as an instant classic by Soviet and American critics. The New York Times reviewer Bosley Crowther applauded Chukray's ability to make the film "flow in such a swift, poetic way that the tragedy of it is concealed by a gentle lyric quality." He also noted the "two splendid performances" by Ivashov and Prokhorenko.

The film received the Lenin Prize in 1961, as did its director and producer.

Awards
 1960 Cannes Film Festival - Special jury prize
 5th San Francisco International Film Festival, 1960 - Golden Gate Award for Best Film and Golden Gate Award for Best Director
 BAFTA Award for Best Film From Any Source, 1961
 Bodil Awards for Best European Film, 1961
 Nomination for an Academy Award for Best Original Screenplay (1961) – Grigory Chukhray and Valentin Yezhov

References

External links
 
 
Ballad of a Soldier an essay by Vida Johnson at the Criterion Collection

1959 drama films
1959 films
1950s drama road movies
1950s Russian-language films
1950s war drama films
Best Film BAFTA Award winners
Eastern Front of World War II films
Films about amputees
Films directed by Grigori Chukhrai
Films set in 1942
Films set in Russia
Films set in the Soviet Union
Films set on trains
Films shot in Vladimir Oblast
Mosfilm films
Films about mother–son relationships
Russian black-and-white films
Russian war drama films
Russian World War II films
Soviet black-and-white films
Soviet war drama films
Soviet World War II films
War romance films